Tectonics is a peer-reviewed scientific journal of geology focusing on tectonics. It is published by the American Geophysical Union in collaboration with the European Geosciences Union.

The journal is edited by John Geissman (University of Texas at Dallas), Laurent Jolivet (Institut des Sciences de la Terre de Paris), Nathan Niemi (University of Michigan) and Taylor Schildgen (University of Potsdam).

Abtrascting and indexing
The journal is abstracted and indexed in the following bibliographic databases:

According to the Journal Citation Reports, the journal has a 2017 impact factor of 3.58.

References

External links

Publications established in 1982
English-language journals
Geology journals
American Geophysical Union academic journals
Monthly journals